The Sovabazar Raj family, seated at Sovabazar Palace in the Indian city of Kolkata, were the Zamindars of Shobhabazar. The clan begins with a Maharaja Naba Krishna Deb Bahadur left behind two sons, adopted son Raja Gopimohan Deb (1768) and his own son Raja Raj Krishna Deb. Raja Gopimohan Deb was founder director of Hindu College and founder of famous Dharma Sabha. He offered much precious gold and silver to Maa Kali of Kalighat. A very well known scholar in Hindi, Parsi, and English. His son was Radhakanta Deb, whereas Raja Rajkrishna Deb (1782–1823) had eight sons.

Shiv Krishna
Kali Krishna
Debi Krishna
Apurba Krishna
Kamal Krishna
Madhab Krishna
Narendra Krishna Deb

The Zamindari consisted more than half of Sutanuti and thousands of acres of lands in several districts of Bengal (now parts of West Bengal and Bangladesh).

References

External links
The Sovabazar Zamindari family at Genealogical Gleanings of the Indian Princely States

History of Kolkata
Bengali families
Hindu families
Indian families